Radnor High School is a public high school in Radnor, Pennsylvania. Of all high schools in Pennsylvania, Radnor is ranked 3rd by U.S. News & World Report, and 1st by the Pennsylvania Department of Education.

Overview
Radnor High School is the only public high school in Radnor Township, Pennsylvania. It is part of the Radnor Township School District. Located 13 miles west of Philadelphia, Radnor Township lies along the Philadelphia Main Line. Radnor High School offers many AP and honors courses.

Student body
The high school has 1,177 students in grades 9 through 12. The student body is  mostly white, with a total minority enrollment of 23%. 90% of former Radnor students go on to graduate from four-year colleges and universities.

As of the 2015-2016 school year, the demographics of the student body were as follows:

Extracurricular and athletic activities
Radnor offers a wide range of extracurricular and athletic activities with teams competing in the Central League. Their many clubs for students include Model UN, Robotics, Hi-Q, and Future Business Leaders of America (FBLA).

National recognition
U.S. News & World Report ranks Radnor as the 3rd best public high school in Pennsylvania, and the PA Department of Education ranks it 1st.  In 2012, The Daily Beast ranked Radnor as one of the top 500 public high schools in the nation.

Notable alumni
 
Jan Berenstain '41 co-authored the classic Berenstain Bears book series.
Emlen Tunnell '42 played professional football for the New York Giants and the Green Bay Packers.
Anna Moffo '50 was a prominent soprano opera singer.
Ted Dean '56  played for the Philadelphia Eagles.
Randal Kleiser '64 directed the musical film Grease.
Lance Clemons '65 played in the major leagues.
Jane Barkman '69 won bronze and gold medals in swimming in the 1968 Mexico City Olympics and another gold in the 1972 Munich games.
Thomas F. Wilson '77 played Biff Tannen in the movie trilogy Back to the Future.
Lee Daniels '78 directed Precious: Based on the Novel "Push" by Sapphire (2009) and The Butler (2013)
Michael Hausman '78 founded and drummed for 'Til Tuesday. He currently manages Aimee Mann and Marc Cohn.
Willie Sydnor '78 played football for the Pittsburgh Steelers
Joshua Wurman '78 is a leading meteorologist who invented Doppler On Wheels mobile radars.
Beth Kephart '78 is the author of thirteen novels and was a finalist for the National Book Awards.
David Brooks '79 is an author and columnist for the New York Times.
Mary Ellen Clark '81 won bronze medals in platform diving in the Barcelona and Atlanta Olympic Games.
Kelly Corrigan '85 is a bestselling author.
Paul Anthony Stewart '88 is an actor.
John DeFilippo ‘96 was the quarterbacks coach for the Super Bowl-winning Philadelphia Eagles. Is now the quarterbacks coach for the Chicago Bears
Alex Ross Perry '02 directed Listen Up Philip and Queen of Earth, wrote Christopher Robin (film).
Scott Kahoe ‘05 played professional lacrosse for the Boston Cannons and Florida Launch
Sunil Tripathi '08 Misidentified suspect of Boston Marathon bombing
Colby Cohen (born 1989) is a former professional ice hockey player.
Ari Staprans Leff '12 is a multi-platinum singer, songwriter, and record producer.

References

External links
 Radnor High School Website
 Radnor Township School District Website

Public high schools in Pennsylvania
Schools in Delaware County, Pennsylvania